Panuwat Failai (born March 15, 1986), simply known as Top, is a Thai professional footballer who plays as a defender for Thai League 2 club Trat.

International career
In 2013 Panuwat was called up to the national team by Surachai Jaturapattarapong to the 2015 AFC Asian Cup qualification.

International

Honours

Customs Department
 Thai Division 1 League: 2007

References

External links
 Profile at Goal
https://us.soccerway.com/players/panuwat-failai/132123/

1986 births
Living people
Panuwat Failai
Panuwat Failai
Association football defenders
Panuwat Failai
Panuwat Failai
Panuwat Failai
Panuwat Failai
Panuwat Failai
Panuwat Failai
Panuwat Failai